Green Township is one of thirteen townships in Fremont County, Iowa, United States.  As of the 2010 census, its population was 281 and it contained 122 housing units.

Geography

Cities, towns, villages
 Tabor

Cemeteries
The township contains Dawsonburg Cemetery, Mount Zion Cemetery, Penny Cemetery, Rhodes Cemetery and Ross Cemetery.

Transportation
 U.S. Route 275

School districts
 Fremont-Mills Community School District
 Sidney Community School District

Political districts
 Iowa's 3rd congressional district
 State House District 23
 State Senate District 12

References

External links
 City-Data.com

Townships in Iowa
Townships in Fremont County, Iowa